Shahid Ali Khan may refer to:
 Shahid Ali Khan (field hockey), Pakistani field hockey player
 Shahid Ali Khan (singer), Pakistani-Canadian Qawwali singer
 Shahid Ali Khan (politician), Indian politician

See also
Shahid Ali (disambiguation)